The 1993 Grote Prijs Jef Scherens was the 27th edition of the Grote Prijs Jef Scherens cycle race and was held on 5 September 1993. The race started and finished in Leuven. The race was won by Frans Maassen.

General classification

References

1993
1993 in road cycling
1993 in Belgian sport